Men's Giant Slalom and Super G World Cup 1984/1985

This was the third and last year, when Giant Slalom and Super G were count together in one World Cup.

Calendar

Final point standings

In Men's Giant Slalom and Super G World Cup 1984/85 the best 5 results count. Deductions are given in brackets.

References
 fis-ski.com

World Cup
FIS Alpine Ski World Cup men's giant slalom discipline titles
FIS Alpine Ski World Cup men's Super-G discipline titles